Loushan Pass (忆秦娥·娄山关) is a ci poem written by Mao Zedong in February, 1935, during the Long March. Loushan Pass itself is a gorge among mountains in Guizhou province, China. Mao wrote this poem after the Red Army defeated the local government army after a fierce battle and occupation the pass.

Fierce the west wind,
Wild geese cry under the frosty morning moon.
Under the frosty morning moon
Horses' hooves clattering,
Bugles sobbing low.

Idle boast the strong pass is a wall of iron,
With firm strides we are crossing its summit.
We are crossing its summit,
The rolling hills sea-blue,
The dying sun blood-red.

References

Chinese poems
1935 poems
Works by Mao Zedong